Levaia (before 1926: Έλλεβη - Ellevi, between 1926 and 1988: Λακκιά - Lakkia) is a village in the region of Florina, northern Greece. It belonged to the municipality of Filotas but after the application of the Kallikratis Plan in 2011 it got incorporated in the municipality of Amyntaio. According to the 2011 Greek census, the village had 919 inhabitants.

Demographics 
In statistics gathered by Vasil Kanchov in 1900, Elevi was populated by 700 Muslim Turks.

The Greek census (1920) recorded 986 people in the village and in 1923 there were 950 inhabitants (or 160 families) who were Muslim. Following the Greek-Turkish population exchange, in 1926 within Elevi there were refugee families from East Thrace (81), Asia Minor (102) and Pontus (52). The Greek census (1928) recorded 1002 village inhabitants. There were 232 refugee families (973 people) in 1928.

References

Populated places in Florina (regional unit)
Amyntaio